Trama may refer to:
 Trama (aphid), a genus of aphids
 Trama, a genus of moths, synonym of Lesmone
 Trama (mycology), a mushroom's "flesh"